Haig Patigian (January 22, 1876 – September 19, 1950), was an Armenian-American sculptor.

Biography 
Patigian was born in the city of Van in the Ottoman Empire. His parents were teachers at the American Mission School in Armenia.  He was largely self-taught as a sculptor. Patigian spent most of his career in San Francisco, California and most of his works are located in California. The Oakland Museum in Oakland, California, includes a large number of his works in its collection, and more can be seen in and around San Francisco City Hall.

Patigian was an active member of the Bohemian Club, serving two terms as club president. He designed the Owl Shrine, a 40-foot high hollow concrete and steel structure which was built in the 1920s to have the appearance of a natural rock outcropping which happened to resemble an owl. The Owl Shrine became the centerpiece of the Cremation of Care ceremony at the Bohemian Grove in 1929.

Patigian married Blanche Hollister of Courtland, California, in 1908.

Selected public works

McKinley statue in Arcata, California, 1906 (removed February 28, 2019)
Electricity, Imagination, Invention and Steam; four repeated sculptures at the Machinery Palace, Panama-Pacific International Exposition (1915) (destroyed)
General John Pershing, San Francisco, California,  1921
Statue of Abraham Lincoln, San Francisco, California,  1928
Thomas Starr King (1931)
This work resided in the Capitol Building in Washington D.C. as one of California's contributions to the National Statuary Hall Collection until being replaced by a statue of Ronald Reagan in 2009.
Volunteer Firemen Memorial, San Francisco, California,  1933

Architectural sculpture
M. H. de Young Memorial Museum, tympanum, San Francisco, California, circa 1895 (removed)
San Francisco Savings Union Bank building, pediment, San Francisco, California, 1911
Palace of Fine Art & the Machinery Palace, (now destroyed) Panama-Pacific Exposition, San Francisco, California,  1915
Metropolitan Life Insurance Building, (now the Ritz Carlton Hotel) pediment, San Francisco, California,  1920
Navigation, Aviation, and Industry, Richfield Tower, Los Angeles, California, allegorical figures, 1928
when the building was demolished in 1968 the figures were moved to the Art Museum of the University of California, Santa Barbara
Department of Commerce Building, pediment, Washington D.C.,  1934

References

Kvaran, Einar Einarsson, Architectural Sculpture in America, unpublished manuscript
National Sculpture Society, Contemporary American Sculpture 1929, National Sculpture Society, New York, NY   1929
Opitz, Glenn B, Editor, Mantle Fielding’s Dictionary of American Painters, Sculptors & Engravers,  Apollo Book, Poughkeepsie NY, 1986
Proske, Beatrice Gilman, Brookgreen Gardens Sculpture,  Brookgreen Gardens, South Carolina, 1968

External links
Painted portrait of Haig Patigian with Bohemian Owl in background, by Peter Ilyin (1927). Online Archive of California.

American people of Armenian descent
1876 births
1950 deaths
People from Van, Turkey
Armenian sculptors
Armenians from the Ottoman Empire
Emigrants from the Ottoman Empire to the United States
Artists from San Francisco
20th-century American sculptors
American male sculptors
National Sculpture Society members
Sculptors from California
20th-century American male artists